Turkish Futsal League in 2011.

Standings

The tournament consists of Eastern and Western regional tournaments, the top two teams from each group will play the Final Four to determine the champion.

Western Group

Eastern Group

See also
 Turkey national futsal team

External links
 www.futsalplanet.com
 Efes Pilsen Futsal League

Futsal competitions in Turkey
Turkey
Turkey